The Hellions is a 1961 British adventure film directed by Ken Annakin starring Richard Todd, Anne Aubrey, Lionel Jeffries, Ronald Fraser and Colin Blakely that was set and filmed in South Africa.

Plot
A lone law enforcement officer, Sam Hargis (Richard Todd), battles criminals in South Africa when the Billings family of Luke Billings (Lionel Jeffries) and his four sons ride into town to get revenge on Hargis for a previous clash, when he ran Luke Billings out of town.

At first, the locals leave all of the fighting to Hargis, saying that it is his sole responsibility. However, after the Billings kill two innocent residents, some of them arm themselves and shoot dead all the Billings except Luke who, during a fist fight with Hargis, falls from a roof and is killed.

Cast
 Richard Todd as Sam Hargis  
 Anne Aubrey as Priss Dobbs  
 Jamie Uys as Ernie Dobbs  
 Marty Wilde as John Billings  
 Lionel Jeffries as Luke Billings  
 James Booth as Jubal Billings  
 Al Mulock as Mark Billings  
 Colin Blakely as Matthew Billings  
 Ronald Fraser as Frank  
 Zena Walker as Julie Hargis

Reception
The New York Times called it "High Noon on the veldt... wide screen drivel."

References

External links

The Hellions at BFI
The Hellions at Letterbox DVD

1961 films
1961 adventure films
British adventure films
1960s English-language films
Films directed by Ken Annakin
Columbia Pictures films
Films set in South Africa
Films shot in South Africa
Films with screenplays by Patrick Kirwan
South African Western (genre) films
British Western (genre) films
1960s British films